Safouane Attaf (born March 9, 1984, in Kenitra) is a Moroccan judoka. He competed in the men's 81 kg event at the 2012 Summer Olympics; after defeating Liva Saryee in the second round, he was eliminated by Leandro Guilheiro in the third round.  At the 2008 Summer Olympics, he reached the second round, where he was defeated by Euan Burton.

References

External links
 
 
 

1984 births
Living people
Moroccan male judoka
Olympic judoka of Morocco
Judoka at the 2008 Summer Olympics
Judoka at the 2012 Summer Olympics
Mediterranean Games bronze medalists for Morocco
Competitors at the 2009 Mediterranean Games
Mediterranean Games medalists in judo
Competitors at the 2013 Mediterranean Games
People from Kenitra
20th-century Moroccan people
21st-century Moroccan people